Trans Executive Airlines of Hawaii is an American airline headquartered at Daniel K. Inouye International Airport in Honolulu, Hawaii, operating cargo flights under the name Transair and passenger air charter and tour flights under the name Transair Global. The airline was started in 1982 by Teimour Riahi. As of 2019, the airline operated a fleet of six Boeing 737-200 (five cargo configuration, one VIP passenger configuration) and four Short 360 aircraft.

According to the airline's website, "The all-cargo B-737 aircraft are operated by Rhoades Aviation,Inc. d.b.a. Transair, and the all-cargo SD3-60-300 are operated by Trans Executive Airlines of Hawaii, Inc. d.b.a. Transair Express."

On July 2, 2021, after but unrelated to the Flight 810 incident, the Rhoades Aviation Inc. division was grounded by the Federal Aviation Administration (FAA) due to maintenance and safety deficiencies. This idled their one remaining operational 737-200 jet, but did not affect operations of the Transair Express turboprops. On May 25, 2022, citing numerous safety violations found during its investigation of Flight 810, the FAA announced that it is revoking Rhoades' air operator's certificate. Among the cited violations were 33 flights undertaken with engines that were not airworthy. Rhoades was given until June 8 to appeal the agency's decision.

Destinations 
Hilo (Hilo International Airport)
Honolulu (Daniel K. Inouye International Airport), hub
Kahului (Kahului Airport)
Kona (Kona International Airport)
Lihue (Lihue Airport)
Kamuela, Hawaii (Waimea-Kohala Airport)
Molokai (Molokai Airport)
Lanai (Lanai Airport)

Fleet

Incidents 

In the early morning hours of July 2, 2021, Transair Flight 810, a Boeing 737-200 cargo aircraft, experienced an engine failure shortly after taking off from Honolulu's Daniel K. Inouye International Airport en route to the neighboring Hawaiian island of Maui. Both pilots were rescued by the United States Coast Guard. The U.S. National Transportation Safety Board initiated actions to conduct an accident investigation.

On July 16, the FAA revoked the maintenance inspection authority of Rhoades Aviation, the certificate holder that operates the 737-200 aircraft, based on findings from an ongoing investigation of its operation that began in 2020.

On January 29, 1996, at 0435 hours Hawaiian standard time, a Cessna 402B, N999CR, collided with gradually rising terrain while on takeoff from the Wiamea-Kohala Airport, Kamuela, Hawaii. The aircraft was destroyed. The certificated airline transport pilot sustained fatal injuries, and two onboard cargo loaders received serious injuries. The aircraft was being operated as a contract mail flight by Trans Executive Airlines of Hawaii under 14 CFR Part 135 when the accident occurred. The flight originated in Honolulu, Hawaii, at 0200. The flight departed Kamuela on the return leg of the flight at 0430.

See also
List of airlines in Hawaii

References

External links
 
 Interisland Airways

Airlines established in 1982
Airlines based in Hawaii
American companies established in 1982
Cargo airlines of the United States
Charter airlines of the United States
Companies based in Honolulu
1982 establishments in Hawaii